was a U.S. Navy tugboat laid down as YT–262, 20 June 1943 at J.M. Martinac Shipbuilding Corp., Tacoma, Washington launched 27 March 1944; reclassified YTB 262, 15 May 1944: and placed in service 23 August 1944.

Service life

After sea trials Oneyana departed the West Coast for duty under the Commandant, 14th Naval District. As a harbor tug she assisted the larger naval vessels in docking and berthing at Pearl Harbor and executed towing missions throughout the Hawaiian Islands for over 17 years. Redesignated YTM–262 in February 1962 she was shortly thereafter struck from the Naval Register and authorized for disposal in August 1963.

References 
 
 Online: Service Ship Photo Archive Oneyana (YTB-262)
 Shipbuilding History.com website

Tugs of the United States Navy
1944 ships
Ships built in Tacoma, Washington